Sheena Blackhall is a Scottish poet, novelist, short story writer, illustrator, traditional story teller and singer.
Author of over 180 poetry pamphlets, 15 short story collections, 4 novels and 2 televised plays for children, The Nicht Bus and The Broken Hert. Along with Les Wheeler, she co-edits the Doric resource Elphinstone Kist, and has worked on the Aberdeen Reading Bus, as a storyteller and writer, also sitting on the editorial board for their children's publications in Doric, promoting Scots culture and language in the North East. In 2018 Aberdeen University awarded her the degree of Master of the University. In 2021 she was appointed SPL’s poetry ambassador for the Scots language.

Biography
Sheena Blackhall (b. Sheena Booth Middleton) was born in 1947 in Aberdeen, daughter of the manager of Strachan's Deeside Omnibus Service, Charles Middleton, and his second cousin, farmer's daughter Winifred Booth. She was educated in Aberdeen, but summered in Ballater for many years. Her brother, Ian Middleton, was an accomplished organist and clavichord player, who was the manager of a merchant bank in São Paulo, Brazil, where he settled and died.  During the typhoid epidemic in Aberdeen of 1964, Blackhall was hospitalized in the town's City Hospital for several weeks. The family transport firm, owned by her aunt, closed as a side effect of this.

After a year's study at Gray's School of Art, Blackhall passed a teaching diploma and worked for a time as a special needs teacher, marrying and raising a family of 4 in this period, when she wrote children's stories for BBC Radio Scotland. In 1994 she obtained a Bsc (Hons. Psych) from the Open University, going on to gain an M.Litt with Distinction from Aberdeen University in 2000. From 1998–2003 she was Creative Writing Fellow in Scots at Aberdeen University's  Elphinstone Institute and is currently attached to the Institute as an Honorary Research Associate. In 2003 she travelled as part of a group to Washington, showcasing Scotland's culture as a guest of the Smithsonian Institution. In 2007 she was Creative Writing Tutor at the Institute of Irish and Scottish studies at King's College, and two years later was Writer in Residence during Aberdeen University's Word Festival. In April 2009 she was inaugurated as Makar for Aberdeen and the North East of Scotland.
The Doric Board appointed Blackhall Nor East Makar for 3 years in November 2019, when her 146th pamphlet was published

Awards and honours
She has won the Robert McLellan tassie for best Scots short story 3 times (1989, 1990, 2001) and the Hugh MacDiarmid trophy for best Scots poem 4 times (1990,2000,2001,2010). In 1992 she shared the Sloane Award with Matthew Fitt from St. Andrew's University. Other prizes include awards from the Doric Festival, the Bennachie Baillies, and from the TMSA for ballad writing and traditional singing. She has twice been shortlisted for the Callum Macdonald Poetry Pamphlet prize (2005 & 2009). In 2007, Lallans Magazine awarded her the William Gilchrist Graham prize for best Scots short story. She has also been shortlisted for the McCash poetry prize. She has also won the prize for best Scots Poem at Wigtown. Her short story 'The Wall', was the winning entry in Bipolar Scotland's 2013 competition, featuring in the Scottish Mental Health Arts and Film Festival. In 2016 she became an Honorary Fellow of the WORD Centre for Creative Writing, Aberdeen University. In 2019 she was presented with The Janet Paisley Lifetime Achievement Award.In 2020 Blackhall became an Honorary Officer of Merit  of the Confraternity of the Knights of the Most Holy Trinity (Priory of Scotland) . She was to be awarded the Eagle of Honour medal, to be presented  by the Knights after the coronavirus pandemic passed.

Influences
She trained as a Creative Writing tutor with Survivor's Poetry Scotland, under Larry Butler, and was a member of the Arts and health organization, Lapidus. A Buddhist, she goes on annual retreats to Dhankosa, Balquidder. Blackhall also worked alongside Aberdeen's well loved 'first lady of drama' Annie Henderson Inglis MBE at Aberdeen Arts Centre, from 2003–2010 delivering weekend storytelling and drama workshops for three- to eight-year-olds.

Works

Novels
 Double Heider Loon 2003 (Itchy Coo) 
 Minnie 3 x CDs, one book (SLRC) 2004 
 The Quarry Lochlands 2007
 The Gods of Grayfriars Lane Lochlands 2008
 Millie ( Reading Bus) 2010 
 Jean Eyre by Charlotte Brontë. 2018. Translated into North-East Scots by Sheena Blackhall and Sheila Templeton. Evertype. 
 Fey Case o Dr Jekyll an Mr Hyde by Robert Louis Stevenson. 2018. Translated into North-East Scots by Sheena Blackhall, and with illustrations by Mathew Staunton. Evertype. 
 The Winnerfu Warlock o Oz by L. Frank Baum. 2018. Translated into North-East Scots by Sheena Blackhall, and illustrated by W. W. Denslow. Evertype. .
 Translation into North East Scots by Sheena Blackhall of O Mice and Men by John Steinbeck pub. evertype 2018

Short stories
 Nippick o Nor East Tales Keith Murray Publications 1989 
 Reets Keith Murray Publications 1991 
 A Hint o Granite Hammerfield Publications 1992
 Braeheid. A Fairm an its Fowk Hammerfield Publishing 1993
 A Kenspeckle Creel Hammerfield Publishing 1995
 Wittgenstein's Web G.K.B.Enterprises 1996 
 The Bonsai Grower GKB Enterprises 1998 
 The Fower Quarters GKB Enterprises 2002 
 Indian Peter Thistle Reprographics, Limited Edition 2004 (children's stories in Scots)
 Pie in the Sky Thistle Reprographics, Limited Edition 2004 (adult stories)
 Victor Vratch & ither bairn tales Lochlands, Maud, 2009
 Isle o the Deid Malfranteaux Concepts 2010 
 The Jam Jar
 2013: Aberdeenshire Folk Tales By Grace Banks & Sheena Blackhall,pub by The History Press, 2013 .
2014: Scottish Urban Myths and Ancient Legends (Urban Legends) by Sheena Blackhall, & Grace Banks pub. The History Press 
 The Chimaera Institute: e-book 2011 Smashwords
 The Honey that Came from the sea: e-book Smashwords
 Jessie the Jumbo: e-book 2014 : e.pub smashwords.com

Poetry books
 Blackhall, Sheena (2014) The Space Between: New and Selected Poems Aberdeen University Press, pp. 153 + xiv. 
 Stagwyse Selected Poems Charles Murray Trust 1995 
 The Skreich, Poems in Scots & English Lochlands 2010
 Victor Vratch the Craa Lochlands 2009
 Figurehead (Poems & Prose) Lochlands 2009
 The Ship of Fools (Poems & Story) Malfranteaux Concepts 2009
 Cats in a Gale Lochlands 2009
 Danse Macabre: Writings Round a Festival (Poems & Songs) Lochlands 2009
 A Visit to Planet Auschwitz (Poems & Prose) Lochlands 2009
 The Barley Queen (Poems & Prose) Malfranteaux Concepts 2009
 Peacock (Poems) Lochlands 2009
 Wittins (Selected Poems) Diehard Publishers 2010
 The Young Wife pamphlet 181 pub Malfranteaux Concepts

Full list on Blog

What the Open Library holds
 A Bard's Life, published by Rymour Books 2021

References

Sheena Blackhall' Scottish Poetry Library

External links
 Sheena Blackhall's Screivins
 National Library of Scotland
 Poem Hunter
 Bio on BBC website
 Pastoral on G.P.S.
 Official Website
 Podcasts via Scots Language Centre
 Bio on Scottish Book Trust
 Scottish Storytelling Centre

1947 births
Living people
Doric poets
Scottish women poets
Scottish poets
Scottish writers
Scottish women writers
British women short story writers